The 2023 Men's FIH Hockey World Cup was an international field hockey tournament held in Bhubaneswar and Rourkela, India from 13 to 29 January 2023. The 16 national teams involved in the tournament were required to register a squad of up to 18 players.

Age, caps, goals and club as of 13 January 2023.

Pool A

Argentina
Argentina announced their final squad on 21 December 2022. Lucas Vila withdrew injured after the game against South Korea and was replaced by Bautista Capurro.

Head coach: Mariano Ronconi

Reserves:
 Agustín Machelett

Australia
Australia announced their final squad on 12 December 2022.

Head coach: Colin Batch

Reserves:
 Jacob Anderson
 Dylan Martin

France
France announced their final squad on 22 December 2022. Stanislas Branicki withdrew injured after the game against South Africa and was replaced by Timothée Clément.

Head coach: Fred Soyez

Reserves:
 Corentin Sellier

South Africa
South Africa announced their final squad on 9 December 2022.

Head coach: Cheslyn Gie

Reserves:
 Tyson Dlungwana
 Luke Wynford

Pool B

Belgium
Belgium announced their final squad on 5 December 2022.

Head coach:  Michel van den Heuvel

Reserves:
 Thibeau Stockbroekx

Germany
Germany announced their final squad on 6 December 2022.

Head coach: André Henning

Reserves:
 Niklas Bosserhoff
 Paul-Philipp Kaufmann

Japan
Japan announced their final squad on 19 December 2022.

Head coach: Akira Takahashi

Reserves:
 Yuma Nagai
 Hiromasa Ochiai

South Korea
Head coach: Sin Seok-gyo

Pool C

Chile
Chile announced its final squad on 28 December 2022.

Head coach: Jorge Dabanch

Malaysia
Malaysia announced their final squad on 29 December 2022.

Head coach: Arul Selvaraj

Netherlands
The Netherlands announced their final squad on 9 November 2022.

Head coach: Jeroen Delmee

Reserves:
 Jasper Brinkman
 Dennis Warmerdam

New Zealand
New Zealand announced their final squad on 7 December 2022.

Head coach:  Greg Nicol

Reserves:
 David Brydon

Pool D

England
England announced their final squad on 29 December 2022.

Head coach: Paul Revington

India
India announced their final squad on 23 December 2022.

Head coach:  Graham Reid

Reserves:
 Jugraj Singh

Spain
Spain announced its final squad on 23 December 2022. César Curiel withdrew injured after the game against England and was replaced by Pere Amat.

Head coach:  Maximiliano Caldas

Reserves:
 Rafael Villalonga

Wales
Wales announced its final squad on 29 December 2022.

Head coach: Daniel Newcombe

Reserves:
 Dale Hutchinson
 Jolyon Morgan

References

Squads
Men's Hockey World Cup squads